Winbert F. "Bert" Mulholland (August 27, 1883 - July 12, 1968) was an American Hall of Fame Thoroughbred horse racing trainer.

Born in Lexington, Kentucky, the American heartland for Thoroughbred horse breeding, Bert Mulholland began his career in racing  as an exercise rider for his uncle, W. C. "Farmer Bill" Scully.

In 1923 Bert Mulholland became a foreman for the George D. Widener, Jr. racing stable. He eventually became Jack Joyner's assistant trainer and in 1933 was made head trainer, a position in which he had considerable success. Racing primarily at tracks on the East Coast of the United States, among his successes he won the 1962 Belmont Stakes, the third leg of the U.S. Triple Crown series, and  through 2018 he holds the record for most wins in the prestigious Travers Stakes with five.

Champions trained by Bert Mulholland:
 High Fleet - American Champion Three-Year-Old Filly (1943)
 Platter - American Champion Two-Year-Old Colt (1943)
 Stefanita - American Champion Three-Year-Old Filly (1943)
 Battlefield - American Champion Two-Year-Old Colt (1950)
 Evening Out - American Champion Two-Year-Old Filly (1953)
 Jaipur - American Champion Three-Year-Old Male Horse (1962)

In 1967, Bert Mulholland was inducted in the United States' U.S. Racing Hall of Fame. A resident of Lafayette Hill, Pennsylvania, he died at age eighty-four in 1968 at Germantown Hospital in Philadelphia.

References
July 13, 1968 New York Times obituary for Bert Mulholland
 National Museum of Racing and Hall of Fame

1883 births
1968 deaths
American horse trainers
United States Thoroughbred Racing Hall of Fame inductees
Horse trainers from Lexington, Kentucky